Porteirão is a municipality in south Goiás state, Brazil.

Geographical Information

Porteirão is located in the Meia Ponte Microregion in the Rio dos Bois basin.  It is connected by a state highway (27 km.) with the BR-452 highway, which connects Rio Verde with Itumbiara.

The distance to the state capital, Goiânia, is 178 km.  Highway connections from Goiânia are made by GO-040 / Aragoiânia / Cromínia / GO-319 / Pontalina / GO-040 / Aloândia / BR-452 / Bom Jesus de Goiás / GO-410. For the complete list of all distances in Goiás see Seplan

Neighboring municipalities are:
north: Acreúna 
south:  Goiatuba
east:  Vicentópolis and Goiatuba
west:  Santa Helena de Goiás

Political Information
Mayor: Pedro Augusto dos Reis (January 2005 to January 2009)

Demographics
Population density: 4.98 inhabitants/km2 (2007)
Urban population: 2,726(2007)
Rural population: 282 (2007)
Population growth or loss:  0.91% from 2000/2007

The economy

The economy is based on agriculture, cattle raising, services, public administration, and small transformation industries. 
Industrial units: 2 (2006)
Commercial units: 45 (2006)
Cattle herd: 24,280 head (2006)
Main crops (2006): cotton, rice, sugarcane (13,000 hectares), beans, soybeans (18,000 hectares), sorghum, and corn.
People employed in agriculture:  1,670
Number of farming establishments: 43
Area of the farming establishments:  27,367 ha.
Area in planted crops:  17,500 ha. 
Farming establishments with tractors: 14

Education (2006)
Schools: 2 with 821 students 
Higher education: none
Adult literacy rate: 80.4% (2000) (national average was 86.4%)

Health (2007)
Hospitals: 0
Hospital beds: 0
Ambulatory clinics: 1
Infant mortality rate: 27.9 (2000) (national average was 33.0).

Qualtity of Life

The municipality achieved a score of 0.724 on the United Nations Human Development Index (2000), ranking it 162 out of 242 municipalities in the state of Goiás.  For the complete list see Frigoletto.com

See also
List of municipalities in Goiás

References

Frigoletto
 Sepin

Municipalities in Goiás